Aurélie Rivard (born May 14, 1996) is a Canadian swimmer. After winning three Paralympics gold medals, claiming a silver Paralympic medal and setting two World Records and a Paralympic Record at the 2016 Summer Olympics in Rio de Janeiro, the Paraswimmer was named Canada's flag-bearer for the closing ceremony.

She competed at the 2020 Summer Paralympics, winning a bronze medal.

Career 
A Quebecer, she is from Saint-Jean-sur-Richelieu, where she trained at the Club de natation du Haut-Richelieu. In 2017 she moved to Montreal and began training with Canada's High Performance Center. She took up competitive swimming in 2008; with an impairment in her left hand she competes in the S10, SB9 and SM10 disability classifications. She currently holds three World Records in her category.

Rivard competed at the 2010 IPC Swimming World Championships but did not win any medals. At the 2012 London Paralympics she entered six events and won silver in the S10 400 m freestyle. She won five medals at the 2013 World Championships including two silver, two bronze and joint second place in the 200 m medley. At the 2014 Commonwealth Games she won bronze in the 200 m individual medley.

In 2014 Swimming Canada named Rivard "Female Para-Swimmer of the Year".

At the 2015 Parapan American Games in Toronto, Canada, Rivard, who was 19 at the time, became the most decorated female athlete of Parapan Am history, after winning seven medals, six of which were gold.

References

External links
 
 
 
 
 
 
 

1996 births
Living people
Canadian female backstroke swimmers
Canadian female breaststroke swimmers
Canadian female butterfly swimmers
Canadian female freestyle swimmers
Canadian female medley swimmers
S10-classified Paralympic swimmers
Paralympic swimmers of Canada
Paralympic medalists in swimming
Paralympic gold medalists for Canada
Paralympic silver medalists for Canada
Paralympic bronze medalists for Canada
Swimmers at the 2012 Summer Paralympics
Swimmers at the 2016 Summer Paralympics
Swimmers at the 2020 Summer Paralympics
Medalists at the 2012 Summer Paralympics
Medalists at the 2016 Summer Paralympics
Medalists at the 2020 Summer Paralympics
Commonwealth Games medallists in swimming
Commonwealth Games silver medallists for Canada
Commonwealth Games bronze medallists for Canada
Swimmers at the 2018 Commonwealth Games
Swimmers at the 2022 Commonwealth Games
Medalists at the World Para Swimming Championships
Medalists at the 2015 Parapan American Games
Sportspeople from Quebec
People from Saint-Jean-sur-Richelieu
21st-century Canadian women
Medallists at the 2018 Commonwealth Games
Medallists at the 2022 Commonwealth Games